Vojislav of Serbia may refer to:

Višeslav of Serbia or Vojislav, (r. fl. 768-814) Prince of Serbia
Vojislav of Duklja, (r. 1018-1043) Prince of Duklja (titular Prince of Serbia)